Simon Cameron (March 8, 1799June 26, 1889) was an American businessman and politician who represented Pennsylvania in the United States Senate and served as United States Secretary of War under President Abraham Lincoln at the start of the American Civil War.

A native of Maytown, Pennsylvania, Cameron made a fortune in railways, canals, and banking. He was elected to the United States Senate as a member of the Democratic Party in 1845. A persistent opponent of slavery, Cameron briefly joined the Know Nothing Party before switching to the Republican Party in 1856. He won election to another term in the Senate in 1857 and provided pivotal support to Abraham Lincoln at the 1860 Republican National Convention.

Lincoln appointed Cameron as his first Secretary of War. Cameron's wartime tenure was marked by allegations of corruption and lax management, and he was demoted to Ambassador to Russia in January 1862. Cameron made a political comeback after the Civil War, winning a third election to the Senate in 1867 and building the powerful Cameron machine, which would dominate Pennsylvania politics for the next 70 years.

Early life and career
Simon Cameron was born in Maytown, Pennsylvania on March 8, 1799, to Charles Cameron  and his wife Martha Pfoutz Cameron. Charles Cameron's father, named Simon, had emigrated from Scotland to Pennsylvania, in 1765. A farmer, he continued that same trade in Lancaster County and fought for the Americans in the Revolutionary War. On his mother's side, Simon Cameron was the great-grandson of Hans Michel Pfoutz, one of the first Palatine Germans to emigrate to the American colonies, and was the third of eight children born to Charles and Martha Cameron.

Charles Cameron was a tailor and tavern keeper in Maytown, but was less than successful in those occupations. In 1808, he moved from Lancaster County north to Sunbury, in Northumberland County, but within two years was living alone with his wife in Lewisburg and died in January 1811, his children boarding with other families. Simon was sent to live with the family of Dr. Peter Grahl, a Jewish physician in Sunbury. The Grahls, childless, treated him like their son, and he expanded his rudimentary education in the libraries of Dr. Grahl and his neighbors. In Sunbury, he came to know Lorenzo da Ponte, who had been a librettist for Mozart and other composers, and in December 1813, visited Philadelphia with him.

Soon after his 17th birthday, Cameron apprenticed himself as a printer to Andrew Kennedy, publisher of the Sunbury and Northumberland Gazette, and Republican Advertiser. In 1817, though, Kennedy, who had suffered financial troubles, released Cameron from his indentures, and the young man went to Harrisburg, capital of Pennsylvania, where he indentured himself to James Peacock, publisher of the Pennsylvania Republican. This was the leading Pennsylvania newspaper outside of Philadelphia; after two years' apprenticeship, Cameron was made assistant editor.

Involvement with a Harrisburg newspaper meant involvement in Pennsylvania politics; in 1842, Simon Cameron would state that he had attended almost every session of the Pennsylvania General Assembly, the state legislature, since 1817. He met Samuel D. Ingham, the Secretary of the Commonwealth. Ingram was the proprietor of the Doylestown Messenger, and following the departure of its editor, hired Cameron as his replacement, a position he took in January 1821. He held this position throughout that year, but the newspaper was not profitable and merged with another local paper, costing Cameron his job.

Cameron next worked as a compositor for the Congressional Globe, the periodical which reported the debates in Congress. Although it paid little, the job was ideal for a young man interested in politics, as it allowed him to build contacts with national political figures such as President James Monroe and Senator John C. Calhoun of South Carolina. In 1822, he returned to Harrisburg as a partner in the Pennsylvania Intelligencer, and after he was able to purchase the Republican, merged it with the Intelligencer. These enterprises gave Cameron enough security that he felt he could marry, and did so on October 16, 1822, to Margaret Brua. Ten children were born of that marriage, of whom six reached adulthood.

Entry into politics
Cameron benefitted from the election of his friend, John Andrew Shulze as Pennsylvania's governor in 1823. Not only did Cameron spend several years in the profitable post of State Printer, but in 1829, Governor Shulze appointed him Adjutant-General of Pennsylvania. His brief term in this position gained him the rank, which he used as a title throughout his life, of general. With his appointment to that position, Cameron, who had sold his stake in the Intelligencer and brought one in the Pennsylvania Reporter and Democratic Herald, divested himself of his interest in the printing trade and ceased to be an active journalist, though he ensured his state contracts would be transferred to his brother James. Shulze also awarded Cameron contracts for the construction of canals in Pennsylvania.

A delegate from Dauphin County to the Harrisburg State Convention of the Democratic-Republicans in 1824, Cameron was slow to support the presidential candidacy of General Andrew Jackson in the 1824 election, despite Jackson's broad support in Pennsylvania, and only did so because he supported Calhoun for vice president. Secretary of State John Quincy Adams was elected, and made Senator Henry Clay of Kentucky his successor at the State Department. In that capacity, Clay was responsible for selecting three printers in each state to print the laws and resolutions of Congress, and since Cameron was not known as an ardent Jacksonian, his firm became one of the official printers. Cameron corresponded extensively with Clay, offering him political advice on Pennsylvania affairs. Adams advocated internal improvements to the nation's transportation infrastructure, financed by high tariffs, policies Cameron (who was by then involved in a number of businesses that would benefit) approved of. By the time the administration lost control of Congress in 1827, Cameron began to gravitate away from Adams and towards Jackson. In doing so, Cameron followed a new political ally, Pennsylvania Congressman James Buchanan. Nevertheless, his support for Jackson in his successful run for the presidency in 1828 was only lukewarm.

Cameron's support for Jackson grew in the president's first term, though he was busy with his involvement in banking (founding the Bank of Middletown) and canal and railroad construction. Jackson found Cameron to be a useful lieutenant in Pennsylvania. The president had originally pledged to serve only one term, in changing his mind he enlisted Cameron to get the Pennsylvania legislature to pass a resolution urging him to change his mind and run again in 1832. Calhoun had broken with the administration, and Jackson convened the 1832 Democratic National Convention for the main purpose of endorsing a new running mate, Martin Van Buren of New York. Pennsylvania politicians preferred one of their own to run with Jackson, but Cameron arranged a delegation that would back Van Buren, and he was elected along with Jackson. As a reward, Cameron was appointed to the Board of Visitors of the United States Military Academy, though he held the position only briefly. By the mid-1830s, Cameron had built a national reputation in what was becoming known as the Democratic Party. 

Buchanan had left the House of Representatives after 1831, and then served as minister to Russia. When he returned, Cameron tried to get him elected to the Senate in 1833, lobbying the legislature for votes—until 1913, senators were elected by state legislatures. He was not successful, but the following year, Cameron prevailed on Jackson to give Pennsylvania's senior senator, William Wilkins, a diplomatic post, opening a seat that Buchanan might fill. His success in getting Buchanan elected on the fourth ballot pleased both the new senator and Vice President Van Buren, and increased his influence in Washington. Nevertheless, when Cameron sought appointment by Jackson in 1835 as governor of Michigan Territory, he did not get it.

Although he was not a delegate to the 1835 Democratic National Convention, Cameron supported the nomination of Van Buren for president and Congressman Richard M. Johnson of Kentucky for vice president, and campaigned for them; both were elected. Still seeking a federal position, he asked Buchanan for help being appointed a commissioner under the 1837 treaty with the Winnebago Indians, who ceded land in exchange for payments to tribe members as well as to those who had part-Native American descent. The commissioners were to pass on claims by traders to whom recipients were said to owe money. Cameron was named as one of the two commissioners, and in August 1838, journeyed to Prairie du Chien, Wisconsin Territory. There, they adjudicated the traders' claims, and also those of people of part-Native American blood who sought compensation. Many of the latter were represented by whites, and there were allegations of abuses, both at the time and since, though documentary evidence was never presented. According to Cameron biographer Paul Kahan, "the lack of evidence, coupled with the vague assertions of corruption, became a hallmark of this scandal, and it is one of the reasons why it is so hard for historians to assess who was actually telling the truth." According to another biographer, Erwin S. Bradley, "briefly, Cameron's part in the Winnebago affair may be stated as follows: he did exceed his instructions and showed poor business acumen in failing to require bond of the third parties intrusted with the certificates; but the charges ... remain unproved". The impression of corruption long clouded Cameron's reputation, with his enemies mocking him, to his anger, as the "Great Winnebago Chief".

Somewhat shunned after the Winnebago affair, Cameron continued to support Buchanan. The defeat of Van Buren for re-election in 1840 divided Pennsylvania Democrats into those who backed the former president to run again in 1844, and those who supported the administration of Governor David R. Porter. Both Cameron and Senator Buchanan joined the latter camp, and were known as "Improvement Men", and supported continued public improvements, a protective tariff, and the establishment of a state bank. A supporter of Buchanan, Cameron was strongly opposed to the presidential candidacy of Van Buren in 1844, and supported those at the national convention to require a two-thirds vote to nominate, thus effectively dooming Van Buren's candidacy, though his exact role is uncertain. Cameron was unenthusiastic  about the eventual presidential nominee, former Tennessee governor James K. Polk, not liking Polk's ambiguous position on tariffs, and worked for his election in a desultory fashion. Polk won Pennsylvania, and was elected president.

First term as senator

Election of 1845 

Pennsylvania elected a governor in 1844, and Democrats had been divided between supporters of Henry A. P. Muhlenberg and of Francis R. Shunk. Muhlenberg got the nomination, but soon thereafter died, and Shunk was chosen as gubernatorial nominee. Shunk was elected, but former Muhlenberg supporters, including Cameron, feared they would not receive patronage. This divided the party as it prepared to elect a senator in January 1845, and when it became clear that Senator Buchanan would become Polk's Secretary of State, a second seat would also have to be filled.

The factions remained apart as the legislature prepared to fill the seat held by Senator Daniel Sturgeon. Cameron wrote to Buchanan in December 1844, hinting at his interest in the seat, but both factions had candidates in mind. Neither had enough support to be elected by the legislature when it met in January 1845, and as a compromise, Sturgeon was re-elected.

Buchanan resigned following Polk's inauguration in March 1845, and the legislature prepared for an election to fill the remaining four years of his term. Governor Shunk's faction nominated George W. Woodward, as they had to fill Sturgeon's seat, and he gained a majority in the Democratic legislative caucus, though some legislators remained away. Cameron worked to unite the minority of the Democratic Party with the Whigs and Native American Party (or Know Nothings) to gain a majority in the legislature and elect himself. Since the election and especially in his inaugural address, it had become clear that Polk did not support a protective tariff; most of the dissenting Democrats did, as did Cameron and the Whigs.  Cameron also held similar views to the Whigs on internal improvements, and found them willing to support him—he hinted to the nativists that he supported increasing the residence time for immigrants to gain citizenship. To the outrage of the mainstream Democratic Party, on March 13, 1845, Cameron was elected on the fifth ballot with 66 votes (including 16 from Democrats), to 55 for Woodward, and six votes scattered.

Cameron began his first term in the Senate with little long-term support in the legislature, since he was alienated from many of the Democrats and was viewed by the Whigs as the lesser evil to Woodward, to be replaced in better times. Alleging that Cameron had gained the seat by corrupt means, the Democratic caucus sent letters to Vice President George M. Dallas (a Pennsylvanian) and also to Buchanan. The two officials, in their replies, refrained from attacking Cameron personally, though they decried the lack of party loyalty which made his election possible. Although nothing came of this, it added to a growing rift between Buchanan and Cameron.

Events of first term (1845–1849) 
On the day of his election, Cameron wrote to Buchanan, asking him to assure Polk that no one in the Senate would support the administration with more good will than he. Nevertheless, having been elected by uniting disaffected Democrats and the minority parties against the candidate of the Democratic caucus, he found that neither Democrats nor Whigs were willing to fully accept him as a political fellow. Immediately after being elected senator, Cameron went to Washington, where on March 15, 1845, his credentials were laid before the Senate, which was in special session, by Vice President Dallas. On March 17, he was presented to the Senate by Senator Sturgeon, and was sworn in. Three days later, the Senate adjourned until December 1845.

Polk declined to consult Cameron on Pennsylvania federal appointments, though he had been advised by his brother-in-law, James Walker, to make an ally of Cameron, especially since the administration had only a narrow majority in the Senate. Angered, Cameron struck back, defeating the nomination of Henry Horn to the lucrative position of Collector of Customs for the Port of Philadelphia, which Polk pressed repeatedly. Cameron also defeated the nomination of Woodward to the Supreme Court, the latter likely with Buchanan's help. Polk eventually nominated another Pennsylvanian, Robert C. Grier, as a justice; Grier was confirmed, but the president never forgave Cameron.

Cameron and Polk also differed on the tariff. The Whig-backed Tariff of 1842 was protectionist in nature, rather than for the sole purpose of raising government revenue, and Polk's administration sought to revise it through the Walker tariff (named of the Secretary of the Treasury, Robert J. Walker, an advocate of free trade). Cameron felt free to oppose it as he owed no debts to Polk and the Pennsylvania legislature had passed a resolution asking the state's congressional delegation to oppose the legislation. He gave a lengthy speech against the tariff in July 1846 opining that it would harm Pennsylvania's iron foundries, and opining that no native of the state could support the bill. This was a comment aimed at Vice President Dallas; nevertheless, Dallas's tie breaking vote in favor paved the way to the bill's enactment.

A longtime supporter of the annexation of Texas, Cameron backed the declaration of war against Mexico and the Mexican–American War, He opposed, however, the annexation of land where slavery might flourish, and supported the Wilmot Proviso (introduced by Pennsylvania Congressman David Wilmot) which would ban slavery from lands gained from Mexico. At the same time, he stated that the people of Pennsylvania had no desire to interfere with slavery in Southern states where it was legal. Cameron's view on slavery prior to 1861 was that it should be the decision of each state or territory whether to be slave or free, but he sought to guard Pennsylvania's interest by limiting the spread of slavery. He expected that in due course, Southern states would themselves abolish slavery.

Polk was not a candidate for re-election in 1848, and Secretary of State Buchanan sought the Democratic presidential nomination. Cameron was a delegate from Pennsylvania to the 1848 Democratic National Convention and in common with the state's other delegates, supported Buchanan on each ballot. The nomination went to Michigan Senator Lewis Cass, and Cameron was accused of working behind the scenes to defeat Buchanan. The Whigs nominated General Zachary Taylor of Louisiana for president, with his running mate former congressman Millard Fillmore of New York. In the fall elections, the Pennsylvania Whigs carried the state for Taylor and Fillmore (who were elected), with a majority for their party in both houses of the state legislature. Cameron's term in the Senate was up in 1849; the Whigs wanted to elect one of their own, while many Democrats still resented the manner in which he had been elected. Cameron apparently had no supporters in the Democratic caucus; he received no votes in the legislature's balloting for senator, in which Whig James Cooper was elected.

Out of office (1849–1857) 
Once his term in the Senate expired in March 1849, Cameron returned to Pennsylvania and devoted his time to his business enterprises. This did not mean he cloistered himself from politics; his business activities, including railroads and banking, routinely brought him into contact with politicians, and he retained his interest in public affairs. The Democrats recaptured the state legislature in 1850, and Cameron hoped to succeed Sturgeon in the election the following January, but failed to gain enough votes. Nevertheless, the new senator, Richard Brodhead, soon became a political ally of Cameron.

Cameron and Buchanan continued to grow apart, even as Buchanan prepared to seek the 1852 Democratic presidential nomination. In 1850, trying to diminish any southern support the former secretary might get, Cameron sent Mississippi Senator Jefferson Davis a thirty-year-old news article showing that Buchanan had signed an anti-slavery petition. In response, Buchanan had friendly newspapers attack Cameron. The two battled at the 1851 Democratic state convention which nominated William Bigler for governor; though Bigler was elected, Buchanan blamed Cameron for the fact that the Whigs had taken control of the state senate. Pennsylvania's delegation to the 1852 Democratic National Convention, which included Cameron, was instructed to vote for Buchanan; nevertheless, Cameron worked for the nomination of Cass and the evident dissension in his home state's ranks hurt Buchanan's chances. The nomination went to former New Hampshire senator Franklin Pierce. Once elected, Pierce declined to return Buchanan to the cabinet, and Cameron was successful in getting a number of his allies federal positions.

Pennsylvania's next Senate election was in 1855; in the 1854 legislative elections, the Whigs won a majority, which would ordinarily make it very difficult for Cameron to regain the seat. Many members of both the Whig and Democratic Parties were Know Nothings, who sought restrictions on immigration and immigrants, but who also, in the North, opposed the spread of slavery, an issue on which Cameron might find common ground with them. In addition, being a party with few prominent leaders, it was a route to political power for Democrats who wished to avoid Buchanan's hold on the state party, especially after the Kansas-Nebraska Act of 1854 cost the party support in the North. Cameron worked to appeal to the Know Nothing caucus. When the caucuses met in early 1855, Cameron was the choice of the Know Nothing caucus, but disputes about voting meant about half the caucus left and refused to be bound by the outcome. When the legislature voted on February 13, 1855, Cameron had a plurality, but not a majority. Faced with a deadlock, the legislature postponed its voting for two weeks, but when voting resumed, it remained deadlocked, and the senatorial election was postponed, effectively until the next legislature met in 1856, allowed Governor James Pollock to make a temporary appointment.  When the 1856 legislature met, the Democrats had a majority, and Cameron did not attempt to win the seat, which went to Bigler.

Second term as senator (1857–61)

1857 election 
The various factions that opposed the Democrats and the Kansas-Nebraska Act began to coalesce by 1856 into what became known as the Union Party, or Republican Party. Cameron was aligned with many of the new party's views and also saw an opportunity to return to the Senate. He was prominent at many of the meetings that shaped the new party. He attended the 1856 Republican National Convention that nominated former California senator John C. Frémont for president. With Buchanan the Democratic nominee for president, and Pennsylvania a crucial state in the election, Cameron was considered as Frémont's running mate, but William Dayton was chosen. Buchanan won Pennsylvania by fewer than three thousand votes, and Frémont blamed the decision not to choose Cameron as critical to the outcome. The Democrats had a narrow majority in the Pennsylvania legislature against the combined forces of the Republicans and Know Nothings. 

Once the presidential election was over, Republicans considered how to obtain the Democratic votes needed to gain the senatorship. Cameron had the support of Representatives David Wilmot and Thaddeus Stevens of Pennsylvania, who were convinced Cameron could win. Cameron kept his plans as quiet as possible; unnerved by rumors and the memories of Cameron's controversial victory in 1845, Democrats nominated John W. Forney, a journalist and loyal Democrat. Forney had gotten President-elect Buchanan to write a letter of support to show to legislators, but there were three Democratic members who disliked Buchanan and the letter helped them decide to vote for Cameron. They secretly met with Cameron's managers, who told the Republicans and Know Nothing legislators that there would be Democratic votes, and obtained an agreement to support Cameron on the first ballot. In the election on January 13, 1857, Cameron was elected without a vote to spare, to the shock of many legislators and observers. The three Democrats were expelled from their hotels in Harrisburg, and each lost his re-election bid. Cameron was informed of his election by his son, Donald Cameron, who leapt out of a window at the rear of the legislative chamber, and raced to his father's hotel.

The election of Cameron, given the Democratic majority in the legislature, was seen as a great victory for the Republicans, and an embarrassment for President-elect Buchanan. The Democrats alleged bribery, and the legislature formed a committee to investigate, but the majority found no evidence to substantiate any charges. Similarly, shortly after Cameron's swearing-in, Senator Bigler presented a petition signed by 59 members of the legislature asking the Senate to investigate the circumstances of Cameron's election, but the Senate soon dropped the matter, finding there was no proof of wrongdoing. Nevertheless, like the Winnebago matter, the circumstances of the 1857 election gave Cameron a reputation for corruption that proved impossible to shake.

Prelude to war 
Cameron quickly became one of the leaders of the Republican minority in the Senate. He had returned to a Senate far less congenial than the body he had left eight years before, with members deeply divided over slavery. Nevertheless, he maintained friendships with Southern senators. The divisions manifested themselves during the Senate's debate over whether to adopt President Buchanan's recommendation that Kansas Territory be admitted to the Union under the pro-slavery Lecompton Constitution. Cameron engaged in a verbal battle in March 1858 with Missouri's James S. Green, during which each called the other a liar, and Green suggested the two should fight a duel. The matter was settled, as was usual in such cases, with formal apologies before the Senate. Nevertheless, remembering the recent beating of Charles Sumner, Cameron made a pact with Zachariah Chandler of Michigan and Benjamin F. Wade of Ohio that they would take each other's part in another such incident.

Cameron's view concerning slavery remained much as it had during his first term in the Senate. He opposed its spread, believing it to be against Pennsylvania's interest for it to do so, but thought Congress had no power to do anything about it where it already existed. He also, beginning in about 1859, employed as a servant an escaped slave named Tom Chester. Cameron arranged for him to be educated; he later emigrated to Liberia and became that country's minister to Russia.

Although like most Republican senators, Cameron distrusted President Buchanan, he supported the administration when the president asked for funds for troops in case there should be conflict with members of the Church of Jesus Christ of Latter-day Saints in Utah Territory. Republicans feared Buchanan would use the troops to support pro-slavery elements in Kansas. Cameron was one of only four Republicans to vote in favor. In 1858, Cameron campaigned for the Republicans in Pennsylvania, who were rewarded with control of the state House of Representatives, although Democrats maintained a one-vote majority in the state Senate, Democrats previously had a majority of Pennsylvania's seats in the federal House of Representatives; they were reduced to five out of twenty-five seats. Cameron's influence in Harrisburg allowed him to choose the new officers of the state House, and continued victories in the 1859 state elections magnified his status in Pennsylvania.

A persistent opponent of slavery, Cameron switched to the Know Nothing Party, before joining the Republican Party in 1856.

Election of 1860

Presidential nomination 
The year 1860 was a presidential election year, and Cameron sought the presidential nomination, believing that Pennsylvania's strength at the nominating convention would be sufficient to win. Not all Pennsylvania Republicans supported Cameron, and there were rumors that he had made a deal with the Democrats, or that his candidacy was a stalking horse to build support for the frontrunner, New York Senator William H. Seward. This was supported by a visit Seward had paid to Harrisburg in 1859, in which he had been feted by Cameron. Afterwards, Seward had written to his political manager, Thurlow Weed, that Cameron had promised the ultimate support of the Pennsylvania delegation, though it might initially vote for Cameron. The rumors that Cameron would support Seward were damaging since the New Yorker's abolitionist leanings limited his support among Pennsylvania's conservative voters. Kahan suggested that the fact that Cameron hosted both Seward and another presidential hopeful, Governor Salmon P. Chase of Ohio, in 1859, meant that he was trying to keep good relations with the major contenders for the nomination and place himself in a position to be a kingmaker. There was little support for Cameron outside of Pennsylvania. One of the other contenders, former representative Abraham Lincoln of Illinois, downplayed suggestions Lincoln might take second place on a ticket led by Cameron, Lincoln's supporters discussed the possibility of Cameron as vice presidential candidate, hoping it might win the crucial state of Pennsylvania. 

The year also would see elections for governor of Pennsylvania, and for a legislature that would choose who would fill Senator Bigler's seat. In February 1860, the party state convention endorsed Cameron as Pennsylvania's favorite son candidate for the Republican nomination for president, and chose Andrew Curtin as gubernatorial candidate. There was a strong dislike between the two men, and their supporters, but no one wanted a breach within the party. Curtin had little appetite for a deal between Cameron and Seward, since if Seward headed the ticket, his unpopularity in Pennsylvania might affect Curtin's own election.

In mid-March, Cameron told Seward that he wanted to meet with Weed in advance of the 1860 Republican National Convention in May in Chicago. Confident that Seward would gain the nomination, and of Cameron's support, Weed did not meet with Cameron. Kahan suggested that if the two had met, Cameron would have demanded a cabinet seat for his support, something Weed wanted to avoid.

In Chicago, supporters of his rivals worked to stop a Seward victory on the first ballot, and selected Lincoln as the candidate with the most support. Although Lincoln had instructed his people to make no deals that would bind him, his manager, David Davis, reasoned that Lincoln, not present at the convention, was in no position to judge what had to be done to get him the nomination, and would have to fulfill whatever deals they made. It is unclear if an explicit deal was made to bring Cameron aboard the Lincoln bandwagon, but at the minimum, Davis and others pledged that Cameron would be treated as generously as if he had supported Lincoln from the start. William Herndon, Lincoln's law partner, later wrote that Davis and his fellow managers "negotiated with the Indiana and Pennsylvania delegations and assigned places in the cabinet to Simon Cameron and Caleb Smith, beside making other ‘arrangements’ which [Davis] expected Mr. Lincoln to ratify. Of this he [Lincoln] was undoubtedly unaware."

According to Bradley, Cameron could not have delivered the delegation to Seward had he wanted to, given the opposition to the New Yorker in the state. On the first ballot, a divided Pennsylvania delegation came together to cast 47 votes of 54 for Cameron, as Seward had a plurality, with Lincoln behind him and Cameron third. On the second ballot, Lincoln received 48 votes from Pennsylvania, as he almost erased Seward's lead. On the third, on which Lincoln was nominated, Lincoln's Pennsylvania vote increased to 52.

Campaign 
The understanding between Lincoln's backers and Cameron's became public almost at once, with one newspaper printing that the senator had been promised the Treasury Department. In the campaign, Cameron was a strong supporter of Lincoln, stating that he welcomed Lincoln's nomination "in a most cordial and emphatic manner". In August, Cameron wrote to the presidential candidate, pledging that Pennsylvania would vote for him, and "the state is for you and we all have faith in your good intentions to stand by her interests". Cameron also sent a contribution of $800 to Davis. To establish his soundness on the tariff question, which was important in Pennsylvania, Lincoln had Davis show Cameron excerpts from speeches he had given in the 1840s; Cameron wrote to Lincoln that he was pleased with their content. Cameron also campaigned for Curtin, though antagonism between the two continued.

On October 9, 1860, Pennsylvania state elections were held. Curtin was easily elected, and Republicans increased their margins in both houses of the legislature. This meant that Senator Bigler would almost certainly be replaced by a Republican, and if Cameron resigned to accept high office, his successor would also be a Republican. Republican Party leaders did not rest on their state laurels but pressed for a heavy majority for Lincoln. On Election Day, November 6, 1860, Republicans flipped Pennsylvania to their party, something confirmed by a telegram from Harrisburg to Lincoln's headquarters in Springfield after midnight, "Hon. A. Lincoln: Pennsylvania, 70,000 for you. New York safe, Glory enough. S. Cameron."

Secretary of War

Appointment

In drafts Lincoln made of his cabinet following the election, Cameron was omitted. Given the divisions between Cameron and Curtin supporters in Pennsylvania, Lincoln planned to exclude Cameron from the cabinet, hoping both factions would accept New Jersey's William Dayton, like Cameron a strong protectionist, Within days, though, Lincoln began receiving many letters urging him to make Cameron Secretary of the Treasury. 

Lincoln may still have been unaware of the understanding made at the convention; his advisor, Leonard Swett, wrote to Cameron on November 27, 1860, that Lincoln was not bound by any such bargain. Swett sent a copy to the president-elect, who did nothing initially, but asked Weed for his view on Cameron on December 20. Cameron had reneged on his support for Seward, Weed's candidate, and Weed advised excluding Cameron in favor of a trustworthy Southerner. Cameron would not visit Lincoln's hometown of Springfield, Illinois without an invitation, and, after sending Swett to Pennsylvania to confer with him, Lincoln felt compelled to invite Cameron, who arrived on December 30, 1860. Others urged Lincoln to leave Cameron out of the cabinet, citing the Winnebago affair or the allegations of bribery in his elections to the Senate; former congressman George N. Eckert wrote, "I wish to say to you that under no circumstances or contingency will it answer to even dream of putting Simon Cameron in the Cabinet. He is corrupt beyond belief. He is rich by plunder— and can not be trusted any where."

Upon his arrival in Springfield, Cameron met with Lincoln for several hours, first at the president-elect's law office and then at the senator's hotel. Both men were personable in nature, and the meetings were enjoyable; at their conclusion, Lincoln offered Cameron a place in the cabinet, either as Secretary of the Treasury or of War. At Cameron's request, Lincoln gave him the offer in writing, which he regretted soon thereafter, as no sooner had Cameron left town, that a fresh flood of anti-Cameron communications came to him, and he met with Alexander McClure, a member of a faction in Pennsylvania opposed to Cameron. Lincoln wrote to withdraw the offer, asking Cameron to keep it confidential, unless he chose to publicly decline, in which case he had no objection to the offer being made public. One reason for Lincoln's about-face was that he had asked Cameron to keep the offer confidential, which he had not done. Cameron complained to Lincoln's associates about the president-elect's conduct, but did and said nothing publicly, and in fact arranged for Lincoln and his family to use a luxurious Pennsylvania Railroad car for the journey to Washington.

In early January, after meeting with Chase, who he wanted in the cabinet, Lincoln told two of his advisers, "I am in a quandary. Pennsylvania is entitled to a cabinet office. [Lincoln had received] hundreds of letters, and the cry is 'Cameron, Cameron!' … The Pennsylvania people say: 'If you leave out Cameron you disgrace him.'" Lincoln decided not to offer Cameron the Treasury post, but to hold out the possibility of another appointment. On January 13, Lincoln sent Cameron a letter stating he meant no offense by the previous letter, and stating that he had no doubt Cameron would perform the duties of a cabinet secretary "ably and faithfully". Cameron continued to press Lincoln by displaying the December 31 letter offering a post without showing the January 3 one rescinding the offer. With much of Lincoln's cabinet undetermined by the end of January, Herndon wrote, "Lincoln is in a fix. Cameron’s appointment ...  bothers him. If Lincoln do[es] appoint Cameron, he gets a fight on his hands, and if he do[es] not he gets a quarrel deep-abiding, & lasting ... Poor Lincoln! God help him!"

At the behest of Cameron supporters Lincoln met with, the president-elect offered another meeting in Springfield, but Cameron refused, and the matter was still unresolved when Lincoln left for Washington. When the train passed through Pittsburgh, Lincoln was met with a group of Cameron supporters who insisted he be appointed to the cabinet. In Philadelphia, other Cameron acolytes buttonholed Lincoln, both in the lobby of his hotel, and at his room. Tired of this, he hinted he might keep holdovers from the Buchanan cabinet rather than appoint Cameron.

Cameron's opponents in Pennsylvania, likely out of fear the state would go unrepresented in the cabinet, dropped their opposition to him. When Lincoln stopped in Philadelphia, a group of supporters of Governor Curtin told him that Curtin now supported Cameron's cabinet bid. Lincoln still made no decision until after he reached Washington, when after much soul-searching he decided to appoint Cameron to the cabinet. Cameron still wanted the Treasury position, which went to Chase, and only reluctantly accepted War. After discussions between the two on February 28 and March 1, 1861, Lincoln nominated Cameron to be Secretary of War on March 5, 1861, the day after he took office as president.

He broke with Lincoln and openly advocated emancipating the slaves and arming them for the army at a time when Lincoln was not ready to publicly take that position. Cameron's tenure as Secretary of War was marked by allegations of corruption and lax management.

Tenure 
Cameron was sworn in as Secretary of War on March 12, 1861. The week's delay in swearing-in was because Cameron was in Pennsylvania and has been taken by some historians to mean that, even amid the rapidly-worsening secession crisis, that Cameron did not take his new position seriously. Kahan pointed out that at Lincoln's first cabinet meeting, on March 6, there was no mention of the increasingly-desperate situation at Fort Sumter. At the cabinet meeting of March 15, Lincoln asked his cabinet members for their views on Sumter and Cameron stated that the fort, isolated in the harbor of seceded Charleston, South Carolina, should not be resupplied since it could not be held indefinitely.

On April 18, 1861, the day after Virginia seceded from the Union, the Virginia militia seized Harpers Ferry, an important work station on the rival Baltimore and Ohio Railroad's main westward line and a strategically important connection between Washington, D.C., and the American West.

Under threats of destruction or confiscation from the Governor of Virginia and mayor of nearby Charles Town, B&O president John Work Garrett asked Cameron to protect the B&O. Instead, Cameron warned Garrett that passage of any Confederate troops over his line would be treason. Cameron agreed to station troops to protect other rail lines, including the Pennsylvania, but flatly refused to help the B&O. The B&O had to repair damaged line at its own expense and often received late or no payment for services rendered to the federal government. The Harpers Ferry Bridge was blown up by order of Confederate General Stonewall Jackson on June 14.

On June 20, 1861, Jackson seized Martinsburg, another major B&O work station. Within weeks, Jackson began confiscating locomotives, train cars, and track for Confederate use in Virginia. With B&O's main line into Washington inoperative for over six months, the North Central and Pennsylvania Railroads profited from overflow traffic.

These problems were partially alleviated by the summer 1861 Union victories at the Philippi and Rich Mountain, and vigorous army and company work crews which reduced the main line gap to 25 miles between Harpers Ferry and Back Creek. However, with no help from Secretary Cameron, Garret appealed to others, including Reverdy Johnson, General George McClellan, and Treasury Secretary Salmon P. Chase.

The gap created in the B&O line dramatically affected civilian life as well. The B&O was forced to arrange to have its coal shipments brought to the capital via the Chesapeake and Ohio canal, but as winter began, coal prices soared in Washington. Western farmers could also not get their produce to markets because of the B&O gap. Finally, Samuel M. Felton, the President of PW&B Railroad notified newspapers of the War Department's discrimination against the B&O.

Cameron's corruption became so notorious that Pennsylvania Representative Thaddeus Stevens, asked whether there was anything Cameron would not steal, said, "I don't think that he would steal a red hot stove." Cameron demanded Stevens retract this insult, and so Stevens said to Lincoln, "I believe I told you he would not steal a red hot stove. I will now take that back."

In January 1862, President Lincoln removed Cameron in favor of Edwin M. Stanton, a Pennsylvania lawyer who had been serving as Cameron's legal advisor. Furthermore, on January 31, Congress passed the Railways and Telegraph Act, creating the United States Military Railroad and allowing it to seize and operate any railroad or telegraph company's equipment, although Stanton and USMRR Superintendent Daniel McCallum would choose to allow civilian operations to continue. In February 1862, Union forces recaptured Martinsburg and Harpers Ferry, and work crews continued replacing wrecked bridges and equipment, although bushwhacker raids continued.

After Stanton's promotion, Cameron became Minister to Russia.

Postwar political boss

Cameron made a political comeback after the Civil War, building a powerful state Republican machine, which would dominate Pennsylvania politics for the next 70 years. In 1866, Cameron was again elected to the Senate.

Cameron convinced his close friend Ulysses S. Grant to appoint his son, J. Donald Cameron, as Secretary of War in 1876. Later that year, Cameron helped Rutherford B. Hayes win the Republican nomination for President. Cameron resigned from the Senate in 1877, after ensuring that his son would succeed him.

In the 1880 United States presidential election, Cameron and his son, along with Roscoe Conkling and John A. Logan, led the conservative, anti-Blaine, Stalwart faction of the Republican Party in their advocacy of nominating Grant for a third, non-consecutive presidential term. The Stalwarts were ultimately thwarted when the Blaine faction formed an alliance with the Half-Breeds to nominate James A. Garfield, who would triumph in the general election over Democratic opponent Winfield Scott Hancock.

Personal life 
Cameron's brother James was Colonel of the 79th New York Volunteer Infantry Regiment and was killed in action at the First Battle of Bull Run on July 21, 1861.

Death 
Cameron retired to his farm at Donegal Springs near Maytown, Pennsylvania where he died on June 26, 1889, at the age of 90.  He is buried in the Harrisburg Cemetery in Harrisburg, Pennsylvania.

Though Cameron also had intended for his son to succeed him as head of the state machine, Matthew Quay ultimately succeeded Cameron as the party boss.

Legacy
According to historian Hans L. Trefousse, Cameron ranks as one of the most successful political bosses in American history. Cameron was shrewd, wealthy, and devoted his talents in money to the goal of building a powerful Republican organization. He achieved recognition as the undisputed arbiter of Pennsylvania politics. His assets included business acumen, sincere devotion to the interests and needs of Pennsylvania, expertise on the tariff issue and the need for protection for Pennsylvania industry, and a skill at managing and organizing politicians and their organizations. He cleverly rewarded his friends, punished his enemies, and maintain good relations with his Democratic counterparts. His reputation as an unscrupulous grafter was exaggerated by his enemies; he was in politics for power, not profit.

Biographer Paul Kahan says Cameron was very good as a "back-slapping, glad-handing politician," who could manipulate congressmen. But he was too disorganized, and inattentive to the extremely complex duties of the largest and most important federal department. He paid too much attention to patronage and then not enough to strategy.

Cameron County, Pennsylvania, and Cameron Parish, Louisiana, are named in his honor, as are:

Simon Cameron House and Bank, Middletown, Pennsylvania
Simon Cameron House, Harrisburg, Pennsylvania
Simon Cameron School, Harrisburg, Pennsylvania

Notes

References

Bibliography
 
 
 
 
 
 
 "Simon Cameron." Dictionary of American Biography (1936) Online.

Further reading 
 Koistinen, Paul A. C. Beating Plowshares into Swords: The Political Economy of American Warfare, 1606-1865 (1996) pp 132–169.

External links

 Simon Cameron biography  in Secretaries of War and Secretaries of the Army a publication of the United States Army Center of Military History
Spartacus Educational: Simon Cameron
Mathew Brady Studio: Simon Cameron
biographic sketch at U.S. Congress website
Biography at Lincoln Institute
Mr. Lincoln and Friends: Simon Cameron 
The John Harris-Simon Cameron Mansion

|-

|-

|-

|-

|-

|-

|-

|-

|-

1799 births
1889 deaths
Activists for African-American civil rights
American abolitionists
American businesspeople
American people of Scottish descent
American bankers
American political bosses from Pennsylvania
Ambassadors of the United States to Russia
Burials at Harrisburg Cemetery
Candidates in the 1860 United States presidential election
Chairmen of the Senate Committee on Foreign Relations
Democratic Party United States senators from Pennsylvania
Lincoln administration cabinet members
Pennsylvania Democrats
Pennsylvania Jacksonians
Pennsylvania Know Nothings
People from Lancaster County, Pennsylvania
Pennsylvania Republicans
People of Pennsylvania in the American Civil War
Republican Party United States senators from Pennsylvania
Stalwarts (Republican Party)
United States Secretaries of War
Union (American Civil War) political leaders
19th-century American diplomats
19th-century American newspaper publishers (people)